This is a list of the musical compositions by William Byrd, one of the most celebrated English composers of the Renaissance.

Vocal works

Masses (c. 1592–5)
Mass for Three Voices (c. 1593–4)
Mass for Four Voices (c. 1592–3)
Mass for Five Voices (c. 1594–5)

Latin motets

Cantiones sacrae (Cantiones , quae ab argumento sacrae vocantur) (1575)
Emendemus in melius á 5
Libera me Domine et pone me á
Peccantem me quotidie á 5
Aspice Domine á 6
Attollite portas á 6
O lux beata Trinitas á 6
Laudate pueri Dominum á 6
Memento homo á 6
Siderum rector á 5
Da mihi auxilium á 6
Domine secundum actum meum á 6
Diliges Dominum á 8
Miserere mihi Domine á 6
Tribue Domine; Te deprecor; Gloria Patri á 6
Libera me Domine de morte aeterna á 5
Gloria patri á 6
Te deprecor á 6

Liber primus sacrarum cantionum (Cantiones Sacrae I) (1589)
(all for 5 voices)

Defecit in dolore – Sed tu Domine
Domine praestolamur – Veni Domine noli tardare
O Domine adjuva me
Tristitia et anxietas – Sed tu Domine
Memento Domine
Vide Domine afflictionem – Sed veni Domine
Deus venerunt gentes – Posuerunt morticinia – Effuderunt sanguinem – Facti sumus opprobrium
Domine tu jurasti
Vigilate
In resurrectione tua
Aspice Domine de sede – Respice Domine
Ne irascaris Domine – Civitas sancti tui
O quam gloriosum est regnum – Benedictio et claritas
Tribulationes civitatum – Timor et hebetudo – Nos enim pro peccatis
Domine secundum multitudinem
Laetentur coeli – Orietur in diebus

Liber secundus sacrarum cantionum (Cantiones Sacrae II) (1591)

for 5 voices:
Laudibus in sanctis – Magnificum Domini – Hunc arguta
Quis est homo – Diverte a malo
Fac cum servo tuo
Salve Regina – Et Jesum
Tribulatio proxima est – Contumelias et terrores
Domine exaudi orationem – Et non intres in judicium
Apparebit in finem
Haec dicit Dominus – Haec dicit Dominus
Circumdederunt me
Levemus corda
Recordare Domine – Quiescat Domine
Exsurge Domine
Miserere mei Deus

for 6 voices:
Descendit de coelis – Et exivit per auream portam
Domine non sum dignus
Infelix ego – Quid igitur faciam? – At te igitur
Afflicti pro peccatis – Ut eruas nos
Cantate Domino
Cunctis diebus
Domine salva nos
Haec dies

Gradualia: ac cantiones sacrae, liber primus (Gradualia I) (1605)

for 5 voices:

Marian masses
Suscepimus Deus
Sicut audivimus
Senex puerum portabat
Nunc dimittis
Responsum accepit Simeon
Salve sancta parens
Virgo Dei genitrix
Felix es
Beata es
Beata viscera
Rorate caeli desuper
Tollite portas
Ave Maria
Ecce Virgo concipiet
Vultum tuum
Speciosus forma
Post partum
Felix namque
Alleluia – Ave Maria – Virga Jesse
Gaude Maria
Diffusa est gratia
Gaudeamus omnes
Assumpta est Maria
Optimam partem
Adoramus te Christe (voice + 4 viols)
Unam petii a Domino
Plorans plorabit

for 4 voices:

All Saints
Gaudeamus omnes
Timete Dominum
Justorum animae  is for 5 voices, not 4
Beati mundo corde

Corpus Christi
Cibavit eos
Oculi omnium
Sacerdotes Domini
Quotiescunque manducabitis
Ave verum corpus
O salutaris hostia
O sacrum convivium
[Pange lingua] – Nobis datus

Miscellaneous pieces
Ecce quam bonum
Christus resurgens
Visita quaesumus
Salve Regina
Alma redemptoris mater
Ave Regina caelorum
In manus tuas
Laetania
Salve sola Dei genitrix
Senex puerum portabat
Hodie beata Virgo Maria
Deo gratias

for 3 voices:

Marian antiphons and hymns
Quem terra pontus aethera
O gloriosa Domina
Memento salutis auctor
Ave Maris stella
Regina caeli

Holy Week and Easter
Alleluia – [Vespere autem sabbathi] Quae lucescit
Haec dies
Angelus Domini descendit
Post dies octo – Mane nobiscum
Turbarum voces

Candlemas
Adorna thalamum tuum

Gradualia: seu cantionum sacrarum, liber secundus (Gradualia II) (1607)

for 4 voices:

Nativity
Puer natus est nobis
Viderunt omnes
Dies sanctificatus
Tui sunt coeli
Viderunt omnes
Hodie Christus natus est
O admirabile commertium
O magnum misterium
Beata Virgo

Epiphany
Ecce advenit Dominator Dominus
Reges Tharsis
Vidimus stellam
Surge illuminare

Corpus Christi and The Blessed Sacrament
Ab ortu solis
Venite comedite
Alleluia – Cognoverunt discipuli
Ego sum panis vivus
O quam suavis
Jesu nostra redemptio

for 5 voices:

Easter
Resurrexi
Haec dies
Victimae paschali
Terra tremuit
Pascha nostrum

Ascension
Viri Galilei
Alleluia – Ascendit Deus
Dominus in Sina
Ascendit Deus
Psallite Domino
O rex gloriae

Pentecost
Spiritus Domini
Alleluia – Emitte spiritum tuum
Veni sancte spiritus
Confirma hoc Deus
Factus est repente
Veni sancte spiritus
Non vos relinquam orphanos

for 6 voices:

SS. Peter and Paul
Nunc scio vere
Constitues eos principes
Solve jubente Deo
Tu es Petrus
Hodie Simon Petrus
Tu es pastor ovium
Quodcunque ligaveris

Miscellaneous
Laudate Dominum
Venite exultemus

Unpublished Latin settings

for 3 voices:
Sanctus (authenticity uncertain)

for 4 voices:
Alleluia. Confitemini Domino
Christe qui lux es

for 5 voices:
Audivi vocem
Benigne fac
Christe qui lux es
Decantabat populus (authenticity uncertain)
De lamentatione Jeremiæ prophetæ
Domine Deus omnipotens
Domine exaudi orationem
Ne perdas cum impiis
Omni tempore benedic Deum
Peccavi super numerum
Petrus beatus
Reges Tharsis (authenticity uncertain)
Sacris solemnis (authenticity uncertain)
Vide Domine quoniam tribulor (authenticity uncertain)

for 6 voices:
Circumspice Jerusalem - Ecce enim veniunt
Deus in adjutorium
Domine ante te
O salutaris hostia

for 8 voices:
Ad Dominum cum tribularer
Quomodo cantabimus

for 9 voices:
Domine quis habitabit

Consort song:
Quis me statim

English music

Psalmes, sonnets, and songs of sadness and pietie (1588)
(all for 5 voices)

Psalms
 O God give ear and do apply
 Mine eyes with fervency of sprite
 My soul oppressed with care and grief
 How shall a young man prone to ill
 O Lord how long wilt thou forget
 O Lord who in thy sacred tent
 Help Lord for wasted are those men
 Blessed is he that fears the Lord
 Lord in thy wrath
 Even from the depth

Sonnets and Pastorals
 I joy not in no earthly bliss
 Though Amaryllis dance in green
 Who likes to love let him take heed
 My mind to me a kingdom is
 Where fancy fond for pleasure pleads
 O you that hear this voice
 If women could be fair
 Ambitious love
 What pleasure have great Princes
 As I beheld I saw a herdman wild
 Although the heathen poets
 In fields abroad
 Constant Penelope
 La verginella
 Farewell false love
 The match that's made

Songs of sadness and piety
 Prostrate O Lord I lie
 All as a Sea
 Susanna fair
 If that a sinner's sighs
 Care for thy soul
 Lulla, Lullaby
 Why do I use?

The funeral songs of that honourable Gent., Sir Phillip Sidney, Knight
 Come to me grief for ever
 O that most rare breast

Songs of sundrie natures (1589)

for 3 voices:
 Lord in thy rage
 Right blest are they
 Lord in thy wrath correct me not
 O God which art most merciful
 Lord hear my prayer
 From depth of sin
 Attend mine humble prayer
 Susanna fair
 The nightingale
 When younglings first on Cupid fix their sight – But when by proof
 Upon a summer's day – Then for a boat
 The greedy hawk

for 4 voices:
 Is Love a boy? – Boy pity me
 Wounded I am – Yet of us twain
 From Cytheron the warlike boy is fled – There careless thoughts are freed – If Love be just
 O Lord my God
 While that the sun
 Rejoice rejoice [Chorus of 'From virgin's womb]
 Cast off all doubtful care [Chorus of An earthly tree]

for 5 voices:
 Weeping full sore
 Penelope that longed for the sight
 Compel the hawk
 See those sweet eyes
 When I was otherwise
 When first by force
 I thought that Love had been a boy
 O dear life
 Love would discharge
 From virgin's womb
 Of gold all burnished – Her breath is more sweet

for 6 voices:
 Behold how good a thing – And as the pleasant morning dew
 An earthly tree an heavenly fruit
 Who made thee, Hob, forsake the plough
 And think ye Nymphs to scorn at love – Love is a fit of pleasure
 If in thine heart
 Unto the hills mine eyes I lift
 Christ rising again – Christ is risen again

The first sett, of Italian madrigalls Englished (1590)

for 6 voices:
 This sweet and merry month of May

Psalmes, songs, and sonnets (1611)

for 3 voices:
 The eagle's force
 Of flatt'ring speech
 In winter cold – whereat an ant
 Who looks may leap
 Sing ye to our Lord
 I have been young
 In crystal towers

for 4 voices:
 This sweet and merry month of May
 Let not the sluggish sleep
 A feigned friend
 Awake mine eyes
 Come jolly swains
 What is life or worldly pleasure?
 [Instrumental] Fantazia
 Come let us rejoice unto our Lord

for 5 voices:
 Retire my soul
 Arise Lord into thy rest
 Come woeful Orpheus
 Sing we merrily unto God – Blow up the trumpet
 Crowned with flowers
 Wedded to will is witless
 Make ye joy to God

for 6 voices:
 Have mercy upon me
 [Instrumental] Fantazia
 This day Christ was born
 O God that guides the cheerful sun
 Praise our Lord, all ye Gentiles
 Turn our captivity
 Ah silly soul
 How vain the toils

Teares or Lamentacions of a Sorrowfull Soule (1614)
for 4 voices:
Look down, O Lord, on me a poor man
Be unto me, O Lord, a tower of strength

for 5 voices:
I laid down to rest and sleep
Come help O God

Unpublished English settings
Services
Byrd wrote at least five services.William Byrd: A Research and Information Guide, Richard Turbet
 Short ('First') Service, for 6 voices
 Venite
 Te Deum
 Benedictus
 Kyrie
 Creed
 Magnificat
 Nunc Dimittis 
 Second Service, for 5 voices
 Magnificat
 Nunc Dimittis 
 Third Service, for 5 voices
 Magnificat
 Nunc Dimittis
 Great Service, for 10 voices
 Venite
 Te Deum
 Benedictus
 Kyrie
 Creed
 Magnificat
 Nunc Dimittis 
 Short Morning Service (fragment)

Full anthems
Arise O Lord (6vv)
Exalt thyself O God (6vv)
How long shall mine enemies triumph? (5vv)
O God the proud are risen (6vv)
O God whom our offences have displeased (5vv)
O Lord make thy servant Elizabeth (6vv)
O praise our Lord (5vv)
Out of the deep (6vv)
Prevent us O Lord (5vv)
Save me O God (5vv) (authenticity uncertain)
Sing joyfully (6vv)

Verse anthems
Alack when I look back
Behold O God the sad and heavy case
Christ rising again/Christ is risen
Hear my prayer O Lord
O Lord rebuke me not
Thou God that guid'st

Consort songs
An aged dame
Ah golden hairs
As Cæsar wept
Blame I confess
Come pretty babe
Content is rich
Crowned with flowers and lilies
Delight is dead
E'en as the seas
Fair Britain isle
Have mercy on us Lord
He that all earthly pleasure scorns
In angel's weed
I will not say
The Lord is only my support
Lord to thee I make my moan
The man is blest
Mount Hope
My freedom
My mistress had a little dog
O God but God
O Lord bow down
O Lord how vain
O Lord within thy tabernacle
O that we woeful wretches
Out of the orient crystal skies
Rejoice unto the Lord
Sith death at length
Sith that the tree
Though I be brown
Thou poets' friend
Triumph with pleasant melody
Truce for a time
Truth at the first
What steps of strife
Where the blind
While Phœbus used to dwell
With lilies white
Wretched Albinus
Ye sacred muses

Keyboard works
BK numbers refer to Musica Britannica: William Byrd Keyboard Music, ed. Alan Brown (London: Stainer & Bell, 2 vols, 1969/71)
My Ladye Nevells Booke (1591)
My Ladye Nevells Grownde, BK57
Qui Passe; for my Ladye Nevell, BK19
The Marche before the Battell, BK93
The Battell, BK94: The souldiers sommons; The marche of footemen; The marche of horsmen; The trumpets; The Irishe marche; The bagpipe and the drone; The flute and the droome; The marche to the fighte; The retreat
The Galliarde for the Victorie, BK95
The Barleye Breake, BK92
A Galliards Gygge, BK18
The Huntes upp, BK40
Ut Re Mi Fa Sol La, BK64
The Firste Pavian, BK29a
The Galliarde to the Firste Pavian, BK29b
The Seconde Pavian, BK71a
The Galliarde to the Seconde Pavian, BK71b
The Third Pavian, BK14a
The Galliarde to the Third Pavian, BK14b
The Fourth Pavian, BK30a
The Galliarde to the Fourth Pavian, BK30b
The Fifte Pavian, BK31a
The Galliarde to the Fifte Pavian, BK31b
Pavana the Sixte; Kinbrugh Goodd, BK32a
The Galliarde to the Sixte Pavian, BK32b
The Seventh Pavian, BK74
The Eighte Pavian, BK17
The Passinge Mesures; the Nynthe Pavian, BK2a
The Galliarde to the Nynthe Pavian, BK2b
A Voluntarie; for my Ladye Nevell, BK61
Will Yow Walke the Woods soe Wylde, BK85
The Maidens Songe, BK82
A Lesson of voluntarie, BK26
The Second Grownde, BK42
Have with Yow to Walsingame, BK8
All in a Garden Grine, BK56
Lord Willobies Welcome Home, BK7
The Carmans Whistle, BK36
Hughe Ashtons Grownde, BK20
A Fancie, for my Ladye Nevell, BK25
Sellingers Rownde, BK84
Munsers Almaine (II), BK88
The Tennthe Pavian; Mr. W. Peter, BK3a
The Galliarde to the Tennthe Pavian, BK3b
A Fancie, BK46
A Voluntarie, BK27

69 pieces in the Fitzwilliam Virginal Book8 pieces in PartheniaThe French coranto, BK21a
The second French coranto, BK21b
The 3rd French coranto, BK21c
A Horne Pipe, BK39
Miserere I, BK66
Miserere II, BK67
Parludam, BK115
A Pavin, BK33a
Galliard, BK33b
Eccho paven, BK114a
The Galliard, BK114b
A Preludium, BK116
Christe qui lux, BK121
Gloria tibi trinitas, BK50
A Verse of Two Parts, BK28
A Ground, BK43
A Grounde, BK9
Clarifica me pater a 2, BK47
Salvator mundi I, BK68
Salvator mundi II, BK69
Ut, Re, Mee, Fa, Sol, La, The playnesong Breifs To Be played By a second person, BK58
Go from my window, BK79
A Ground, BK86
O quam gloriosum est regnum
If my complaints, or Pyper's Galliard, BK118
A Pavion, BK23a
The Galliard, BK23b
Pavin, BK76
A Galliard, BK77
An Alman, BK117
Paven, BK73a
Galiard, BK73b
A Pavyn, BK16a
A Galliard, BK16b
A Pavion, BK72a
The Galliard to it, BK72b

Consort works (unpublished)
3 fantasias, 3vv
4 fantasias, 4vv
Prelude and ground, 5vv
Fantasia, 5vv ('2 parts in 1')
Browning, 5vv
Pavan, 5vv
2 fantasias, 6vv
Pavan and galliard, 6vv

Others

Lost or fragmentary works
Ad punctum in modico á 2 (BB) – Fragmentary
Ah, youthful years – Fragmentary
Behold, how good – Fragmentary
Cease Cares – Fragmentary
Depart ye furies – Fragmentary
Litany á 4 (SATB) – Fragmentary, and a doubtful work
If trickling tears – Fragmentary
In tower most high – Fragmentary
I will give laud – Fragmentary
Jubilate Deo, omnis terra – Fragmentary, and a doubtful work
Look and bow down – Fragmentary
Oh happy thrice – Fragmentary
O trifling days – Fragmentary
Preces Deo fundamus – Fragmentary
Service in F – Fragmentary, and a doubtful work
Sponsus amat sponsam á 2 (ST) – Fragmentary, and a doubtful work
What wights are these? – Fragmentary
While that a cruel fire – Fragmentary
With sighs and teares – Fragmentary

Works believed to be by Byrd
Ave regina caelorum á 5 (ATTBarB) – Claimed to be by "Mr Byrde" in the Paston Lute Book, however the editors of the Tudor Church Music Book'' attributed the work to John Taverner.

Joint commissions
In exitu Israel á 4 (SSAT) – A joint work with John Sheppard and William Mundy.

References

Further reading
  (17 volumes)
  (2 volumes)

External links

 A complete list of works by William Byrd from Stainer & Bell

Byrd, William